Arlington Heights can refer to several places in the United States:

Towns or cities
Arlington Heights, Illinois
Arlington Heights, Ohio
Arlington Heights, Pennsylvania
Arlington Heights, Washington

Neighborhoods
Arlington Heights, Fort Worth, Texas
Arlington Heights, Los Angeles, California
Arlington Heights, Pittsburgh, Pennsylvania
Arlington Heights, Portland, Oregon
Arlington Heights Historic District in Arlington County, Virginia
Arlington Heights, in Arlington, California
Arlington Heights, in Arlington, Massachusetts

See also
Village of Arlington Heights v. Metropolitan Housing Development Corp., a 1977 U.S. Supreme Court case